Jean Andersen (born 17 June 1988) is a South African professional tennis player. He has represented South Africa in Davis Cup matches.

College career
Andersen played college tennis for the Texas Longhorns and was an All-American, ranking as high as number 2 in the National Collegiate Athletic Association in doubles. His father, Johann, was a graduate of the University of Texas. Anderson studied kinesiology while attending the university. In 2011, he qualified for the NCAA Division I Men's Tennis Championship tournament as a doubles player.

Davis Cup
Andersen represented South Africa in a Davis Cup Group I tie in 2013, and in a Group II tie in 2014.

World TeamTennis
Andersen has appeared in matches for the Springfield Lasers of World TeamTennis in three different seasons: 2011, 2014 and 2016.

Coaching
Anderson currently serves as the academy director for T Bar M Racquet Club's tennis academy in Dallas, Texas.

Personal
Anderson married the former Tori Moore of Texas on 10 January 2015.

See also

 South Africa Davis Cup team

References

External links
 
 
 

1988 births
Living people
Texas Longhorns men's tennis players
South African male tennis players
Sportspeople from Cape Town
White South African people
21st-century South African people